Miklós Laczkovich (born 21 February 1948) is a Hungarian mathematician mainly noted for his work on real analysis and geometric measure theory. His most famous result is the solution of Tarski's circle-squaring problem in 1989.

Career 
Laczkovich received his degree in mathematics in 1971 at Eötvös Loránd University, where he has been teaching ever since, currently leading the Department of Analysis. He was also a professor at University College London, where he is now a professor emeritus. He became corresponding member (1993), then member (1998) of the Hungarian Academy of Sciences. He has held several guest professor positions in the UK, Canada, Italy and the United States.

Also being a prolific author, he published over 100 papers and two books, one of which, Conjecture and Proof, was an international success. One of his results is the solution of the Kemperman problem: if f is a real function which satisfies 2f(x) ≤ f(x + h) + f(x + 2h) for every h > 0, then f is monotonically increasing.

Books

Honours 
 Ostrowski Prize (1993)
 Member of the Hungarian Academy of Sciences (corresponding: 1993, full: 1998)
 Széchenyi Prize (1998)

Trivium 
Laczkovich enjoys and performs classical music; he has been active in various choirs in the past decades.

References

External links 
 Homepage at Eötvös Loránd University
 Homepage at University College London 
 A:N:S Chorus, an ensemble focused on 15th-century polyphonic music, of which he is a member

1948 births
Living people
20th-century Hungarian mathematicians
21st-century Hungarian mathematicians
Members of the Hungarian Academy of Sciences
Academics of University College London